"Straight Up (No Bends)" is the debut solo single by East 17 singer Brian Harvey.  The single was released on 23 April 2001 and reached #26 on the UK Singles Chart.

Track listing
"Straight Up (No Bends)" (Radio Edit)
"Straight Up (No Bends)" (Gee Smoove &Stylus Roughhouse Remix)
"Straight Up (No Bends)" (Ignorants Remix)
"Straight Up (No Bends)" (Video)

2001 songs
2001 debut singles
Edel AG singles
Brian Harvey songs
UK Independent Singles Chart number-one singles